In mathematics, the method of dominant balance is used to determine the asymptotic behavior of solutions to an ordinary differential equation without fully solving the equation. The process is iterative, in that the result obtained by performing the method once can be used as input when the method is repeated, to obtain as many terms in the asymptotic expansion as desired.

The process goes as follows:
 Assume that the asymptotic behavior has the form

 Make an informed guess as to which terms in the ODE might be negligible in the limit of interest.
 Drop these terms and solve the resulting simpler ODE.
 Check that the solution is consistent with step 2. If this is the case, then one has the controlling factor of the asymptotic behavior; otherwise, one needs try dropping different terms in step 2, instead.
 Repeat the process to higher orders, relying on the above result as the leading term in the solution.

Example

This differential equation cannot be solved exactly. However, it is useful to consider how the solutions behave for large : it turns out that  behaves like  as x → ∞ . 

More rigorously, we will have , not .

or

Now  suppose first that a solution to this ODE satisfies 
 
as  x → ∞, so that   
  
as  x → ∞.  Obtain then the dominant asymptotic behaviour by setting

If  satisfies the above asymptotic conditions, then the above assumption is consistent. The terms we dropped will have been negligible with respect to the ones we kept. 

Everything is indeed consistent. 

Thus the dominant asymptotic behaviour of a solution to our ODE has been found,

By convention, the full asymptotic series is written as

so to get at least the first term of this series we have to  take a further step to see if there is a power of  out the front.

Proceed by  introducing a new subleading dependent variable,

and then seek asymptotic solutions for C(x). Substituting into the above ODE for S(x) we find

The leading asymptotic behaviour is then

See also
Asymptotic analysis

References

Asymptotic analysis
Mathematical series
Ordinary differential equations